VUAA1 is a chemical compound that works by over activating an insect's olfactory senses causing a repellent effect.  It is considered to be an Orco allosteric agonist.  It was discovered at Vanderbilt University with research being partially funded by the Bill and Melinda Gates Foundation.

VUAA1 is an agonist believed to work by overloading an insect's odorant receptors.  It may be 1000 times stronger than DEET and may lead to, "a powerful new family of compounds that can be used to disrupt the destructive behaviors of nuisance insects, agricultural pests, and disease vectors alike."

VUAA1 has also been shown to stimulate mosquito sperm motility, thus showing a link between a mosquito's sense of smell and reproduction.

References

External links 
 New insect repellant may be thousands of times stronger than DEET

Insect repellents
Triazoles
3-Pyridyl compounds
Thioethers